Wallace Kurth (born July 31, 1958) is an American actor. He began his career in 1987 when he was cast in the role of Justin Kiriakis on Days of Our Lives; he departed the role in 1991. That same year, he joined the cast of General Hospital as Ned Quartermaine (then Ashton), remaining in the role until his exit in 2007. As of 2020, he continues to appear on both Days of Our Lives and General Hospital, having returned in 2009 and 2012, respectively.

Career
In 2005, General Hospital producers bumped Kurth to recurring status and removed his photo from the opening credits. He was the host of his own SOAPNet show, 1 Day With, in which he spends a day with another soap star. He has spent a day with several of his General Hospital pals such as Tamara Braun, Alicia Leigh Willis, Ingo Rademacher, Anthony Geary, Scott Clifton, Rick Hearst, and Tyler Christopher, as well as actors from other soaps. He also narrated the History Channel series Battle 360. He also played the character of Sam Hutchins on As the World Turns for several months in late 2007 and early 2008.

In addition to appearing on television, he also has a band, Kurth and Taylor. The band has performed on and produced songs for General Hospital. As of 2020, Kurth appears on both Days of Our Lives and General Hospital.

In 2020, he starred in the independent film More Beautiful for Having Been Broken.

Personal life

Kurth was born in Billings, Montana. He has been married to Debra Yuhasz since 2003. They have one child: Brogan George (b. November 14, 2004).

Kurth was previously married to Cynthia Ettinger and Rena Sofer. Kurth and Sofer share one child: Rosabel Rosalind (b. September 17, 1996). Kurth also has a child from a previous relationship: Meghann Sidney (b. October 29, 1985).

Filmography

Awards and nominations

References

External links
Ned Ashton character profile on SoapCentral
Justin Kiriakis character profile on SoapCentral

Wally Kurth's official site and forum
Kurth and Taylor official site

1958 births
Living people
American male film actors
American male soap opera actors
American male television actors
American male video game actors
American male voice actors
Daytime Emmy Award winners
Male actors from Montana
Musicians from Manhattan Beach, California
Musicians from Montana
People from Billings, Montana